The Walt Whitman Bridge is a single-level  suspension bridge spanning the Delaware River from Philadelphia in the west to Gloucester City in Camden County, New Jersey in the east. The bridge is named after the poet Walt Whitman, who resided in nearby Camden toward the end of his life.

The bridge is owned and operated by the Delaware River Port Authority.

Overview
Construction on the bridge began in 1953, and it opened to traffic on May 16, 1957. The bridge has seven lanes, three in each direction and a center lane that is shifted variably (via a zipper barrier) to accommodate heavy traffic.

The bridge is a part of Interstate 76 (which, between the river and the Pennsylvania Turnpike interchange in King of Prussia, Pennsylvania, is known as the Schuylkill Expressway; this was originally part of Interstate 676's route until it switched positions with I-76 in 1972).  Along with the Benjamin Franklin Bridge (which carried I-76 until 1972, and has carried I-676 since), Betsy Ross Bridge, Delaware Memorial Bridge, Commodore Barry Bridge, and the Delaware River–Turnpike Toll Bridge, the Walt Whitman Bridge is one of six expressway-standard bridges connecting the Philadelphia area with Southern New Jersey.

The bridge was designed by noted civil engineer Othmar Ammann. The Walt Whitman statue by Jo Davidson was placed at the intersection of Broad Street and Packer Avenue, in Philadelphia near the approach to the Walt Whitman Bridge.

Tolls

A $5.00 one-way toll is charged to westbound passenger vehicles (less than  gross vehicle weight) traveling from New Jersey to Pennsylvania. A $12 credit used to be given on a per tag basis for any DRPA-issued E-ZPass tag that crosses one of the four DRPA bridges 18 times in a calendar month, this was removed during the bridge reconstruction budget increase. Trucks, commercial vehicles, mobile homes and recreation vehicles (weighing at least  gross vehicle weight) pay $7.50 per axle. Seniors aged 65 and over can use a ticket program to pay $2.00 per trip of their $2.50 toll. They can also apply to have the commuter discount applied through their E-ZPass account. There is no toll for eastbound vehicles traveling from Pennsylvania to New Jersey since 1992, when one-way tolls were instituted.

Notable incidents
American professional wrestler Justice Pain killed himself by jumping off the bridge in January 2020.

Gallery

See also
 
 
 
 
 
 List of crossings of the Delaware River

References

External links

Delaware River Port Authority site
 

Delaware River Port Authority
Gloucester City, New Jersey
Suspension bridges in New Jersey
Suspension bridges in Pennsylvania
Interstate 76 (Ohio–New Jersey)
Toll bridges in New Jersey
Toll bridges in Pennsylvania
Bridges completed in 1957
Whitman
Bridges in Camden County, New Jersey
Bridges over the Delaware River
Tolled sections of Interstate Highways
Road bridges in New Jersey
Road bridges in Pennsylvania
Roads with a reversible lane
Bridges by Othmar Ammann
Bridges on the Interstate Highway System
South Philadelphia
Steel bridges in the United States
Interstate vehicle bridges in the United States